Deuterocopus is a genus of moths in the family Pterophoridae. The genus was described by Philipp Christoph Zeller in 1851.

Species
Deuterocopus albipunctatus T. B. Fletcher, 1910
Deuterocopus alopecodes Meyrick, 1911
Deuterocopus atrapex T. B. Fletcher, 1910
Deuterocopus bathychasma T. B. Fletcher, 1910
Deuterocopus deltoptilus Meyrick, 1930
Deuterocopus devosi Gielis, 2003
Deuterocopus famulus Meyrick, 1908
Deuterocopus honoratus Meyrick, 1921
Deuterocopus issikii Yano, 1963
Deuterocopus melanota T. B. Fletcher, 1910
Deuterocopus papuaensis Gielis & de Vos, 2006
Deuterocopus planeta Meyrick, 1908
Deuterocopus ritsemae Walsingham, 1884
Deuterocopus socotranus Rebel, 1907
Deuterocopus tengstroemi Zeller, 1852

Deuterocopinae
Moth genera
Taxa named by Philipp Christoph Zeller